The Liseberg station is an underground railway station in Gothenburg, Sweden. It is named after the amusement park Liseberg which is located nearby. The station was completed in 1993. Local trains to and from Kungsbacka and Borås stop at the station.

The station is expected to be closed from access in 2026 when the West Link is opened and all commuter trains will go through that link. Then Liseberg railway station will be a ghost station where trains pass through but none stop.

Buildings and structures in Gothenburg
Railway stations in Gothenburg
Railway stations located underground in Sweden
1993 establishments in Sweden
Railway stations on the West Coast Line (Sweden)
Railway stations opened in 1993